Kashi Vishwanath Temple may refer to the following temples in India:

 Kashi Vishwanath Temple, Varanasi, Uttar Pradesh
 Shri Vishwanath Mandir, Banaras Hindu University, Varanasi, Uttar Pradesh
 Kasi ViswanatharTemple, Kumbakonam, Tamil Nadu
 Kasi Viswanathar Temple, Umayalpuram, Tamil Nadu
 Kashi Vishweshwar Temple, Kadugodi, Bangalore, Karnataka

See also
 Vishwanath (disambiguation)